The 1923 Montana State Bobcats football team was an American football team that represented Montana State College (later renamed Montana State University) in the Rocky Mountain Conference (RMC) during the 1923 college football season. In its second season under head coach G. Ott Romney, the team compiled a 5–4 record (1–2 against RMC opponents), finished seventh in the conference, and outscored all opponents by a total of 272 to 69.

Schedule

References

Montana State
Montana State Bobcats football seasons
Montana State Bobcats football